Fordham Heath is a hamlet near the A1124 road, in the Colchester district, in the English county of Essex. It is near the large town of Colchester and the village of Fordham. Fordham Heath has a primary school.

References 
Essex A-Z (page 164)

Hamlets in Essex